Pumpwell Mangalore, Karnataka, India. Pumpwell Junction is one of the busiest junctions in Mangalore. Karnataka bank, one of the major public sector banks of India is having head office at Pumpwell. It plays a significant role in city transport due to the fact that number of important roads including NH-66, Virajpet-Byndoor road passes through this location. Mangalore - Bangalore highway NH-75, connecting two big cities of Karnataka originates here. This is also the place where there is a proposal to build new bus stand under public-private-partnership (PPP) mode.

Notable places 
 Capitanio School
 Indiana Hospital & Heart institute
Karnataka Bank Head office

References 

Localities in Mangalore